Armel Oroko (born 24 December 1980) is a footballer from the Central African Republic.

Career
Before signing with Sogéa FC in the summer of 2008, Oroko played for AS Tempete Mocaf.

International career
He is also a member of the Central African Republic national football team.

References

1980 births
Living people
Central African Republic footballers
Central African Republic international footballers
AS Tempête Mocaf players
Expatriate footballers in Gabon
Central African Republic expatriate sportspeople in Gabon
Central African Republic expatriate footballers
Association footballers not categorized by position